This is a list of yearly Northeast-10 Conference football standings.

Northeast-10 standings

References

Standings
Northeast-10 Conference
College football-related lists